The Buhl-Verville CA-3 Airster (also known as the J4 Airster, after its engine), was a utility aircraft built in the United States in 1926, notable as the first aircraft to receive a type certificate in the US, (i.e. A.T.C. No. 1) issued by the Aeronautics Branch of the Department of Commerce on March 29, 1927. It was a conventional single-bay biplane with equal-span unstaggered wings and accommodation for the pilot and passengers in tandem open cockpits.  Marketed for a variety of roles including crop-dusting, aerial photography, and freight carriage, only a handful were built, some with water-cooled engines as the CW-3, and others with air-cooled engines as the CA-3 . One CA-3 placed second in the 1926 Ford National Reliability Air Tour.

1926 Ford Air Tour, piloted by Louis Meister, and another (designated the CA-3A) placed third in the 1927 Air Derby, piloted by Nick Mamer. One CW-3 and one CA-3 each were evaluated by the United States Army as trainers, but neither were purchased.

Versions

CA
CA-3 Airster (1926) aka J4 Airster or B-V Airster
200 hp Wright J-4 (a.k.a. J-4 Whirlwind)
Folding wings
awarded the first ATC ever issued, March 1927 (ATC 1, 2-6)
one modified under ATC 2-6 as 2p with 220 hp Wright J-5 as a trainer for Army trials
CA-3A Airster (1926)
225 hp Wright J-5
3 built
cost: $9,300
CA-3B Airster (1926)
one built

CW
CW-3 OX5 Airster (1925)
90hp Curtiss OX-5
useful load: 770 lbs
range: 475 miles
Folding wings
three built
CW-3 Wright Trainer (1926)
220 hp Wright J-5
useful load: 885 lbs
range: 450 miles
one built for unsuccessful military trainer trials

Specifications (CA-3A)

See also

References

Citations

Bibliography
 
 http://www.aerofiles.com/_buhl.html
 Federal Aviation Administration history page
 

CA-003
1920s United States civil utility aircraft
Single-engined tractor aircraft
Biplanes
Verville aircraft
Aircraft first flown in 1926